The Olympic Park (French: Parc olympique) consists of a series of venues and sports arenas in Montreal, Quebec, Canada, which was home to many of the venues from the 1976 Summer Olympics.

It is bound by Sherbrooke Street to the north, Viau Street to the east, Pierre de Coubertin Avenue to the south, and Pie-IX Boulevard to the west.

Olympic Stadium 

The Olympic Stadium is a multi-purpose stadium built in the mid-1970s as the main venue for the 1976 Summer Olympics, it is nicknamed "The Big O", a reference to both its name and to the doughnut shape of the permanent component of the stadium's roof.

The stadium is the largest by seating capacity in Canada. After the Olympics, artificial turf was installed and was used by the Expos, Montreal's professional baseball team, the Montreal Alouettes, Montreal's professional football team and CF Montréal, Montreal's professional soccer team. The stadium currently serves as a multipurpose facility for special events (e.g. concerts, trade shows) with a permanent seating capacity of 56,040.

Montreal Tower 

It was designed by architect Roger Taillibert and leans at an angle of 45°, much larger than that of the Leaning Tower of Pisa (less than 4°).

Biodome 

The Montreal Biodome is a facility that allows visitors to walk through replicas of four ecosystems found in the Americas. These ecosystems are the Tropical Forest, the Laurentian Forest, the Saint Lawrence Marine Eco-system and the Sub-Polar Region. The building was originally constructed for the 1976 Olympic Games as a velodrome with 2,600 seats. It hosted both track cycling and judo events. Renovations on the building began in 1989 and in 1992 the indoor nature exhibit was opened. It is part of the Espace pour la Vie district of museums centered around life and nature.

Rio Tinto Alcan Planetarium 

The Rio Tinto Alcan Planetarium is one of the newer additions to Olympic Park. It started its operations in 2013, replacing Montreal's previous planetarium, which closed in 2011. The planetarium features a number of films and expositions centered around astronomy and outer space. It is part of the Espace pour la Vie district of museums centered around life and nature.

Saputo Stadium 

The Saputo Stadium is a soccer-specific stadium and is home to the CF Montréal (formerly the Montreal Impact). It became the CF Montréal's home stadium in 2008 when they moved there from Complexe sportif Claude-Robillard. It is Canada's second largest soccer-specific stadium.

Other facilities 
Olympic Athletes' Village
Maurice Richard Arena (Olympic host of boxing and wrestling events)
Pierre Charbonneau Centre (Olympic host of wrestling)
Olympic Pool (Olympic host of swimming events)
Additionally: Famous Players' Starcité theater, and the Montreal Metro stations Pie-IX and Viau

The area west of Olympic Stadium, home to various outdoor events, is known as the Esplanade. Adjacent to the park across Sherbrooke Street is Maisonneuve Park, which contains the Montreal Botanical Garden (Olympic host of Athletics (20 km walk) and Modern pentathlon) and Montreal Insectarium.

In October 2017, an area in the park that was once referred to as "The Place des Vainqueurs" was renamed "Place Nadia Comaneci" in honour of the Romanian gymnast.

References

External links

Venues of the 1976 Summer Olympics
Mercier–Hochelaga-Maisonneuve
Olympic Parks